Jagdgeschwader 143 was a fighter wing of Nazi Germany's Luftwaffe in World War II.

Fighter wings of the Luftwaffe 1933-1945
Military units and formations established in 1938
Military units and formations disestablished in the 1940s